Oberea euphorbiae is a species of beetle in the family Cerambycidae. It was described by Ernst Friedrich Germar in 1813 originally under the genus Saperda. It has a wide distribution in Europe. It feeds on Euphorbia palustris.

Variety
 Oberea euphorbiae var. intermissa Breuning, 1951
 Oberea euphorbiae var. imitans G. Müller, 1948

References

euphorbiae
Beetles described in 1813